Mocta Douz is a town and commune in Mascara Province, Algeria. Mocta Douz is the site of the terminus of the Mocta Douz-Beni Saf gas pipeline.

References

Communes of Mascara Province